Avatharam (Incarnation) may refer to:

 Avatharam (1995 film), a Tamil film
 Avatharam (2014 Malayalam film), a Malayalam film
 Avatharam (2014 Telugu film), a Telugu film